The A21, also Comber road, is a road in County Down in Northern Ireland. The route commences in Bangor, passing through Newtownards, Comber, and Ballygowan, and finishes on the northern outskirts of Ballynahinch.

There are two dual carriageway sections; between Bangor and Newtownards, and between Newtownards and Comber. The second of these passes through farmland near the northern shores of Strangford Lough. This section also passes within 2 miles of Scrabo Tower.

References

Roads in County Down
2-0021